João Carlos de Oliveira, also known as "João do Pulo" (May 28, 1954May 29, 1999) was a Brazilian athlete who competed in the triple jump and the long jump.

Born in Pindamonhangaba, São Paulo De Oliveira won two Olympic bronze medals. His personal best of 17.89 metres, set on October 15, 1975 in Pan American Games, stood as the world record until 1985. As of today, it is still in the top twenty of all-time best results in the event.

Career 
Orphaned by his mother, he started working at the age of seven, as a car washer. In 1973, coached by Pedro Henrique de Toledo, he broke the junior triple jump world record at the South American Athletics Championships with the mark of 14.75 m. In 1975, already as an adult athlete at the Pan American Games in Mexico City, the corporal of the Brazilian Army won the gold medal in the long jump with the mark of 8.19 m and, on October 15, also the gold medal in the triple jump, with the incredible mark of 17.89 m, breaking the world record of this modality in 45 cm, that belonged to the Soviet Viktor Saneyev.

He was the gold medal favorite in the triple jump at the Montreal Olympics, but, recovering from belly surgery, he jumped just 16.90 m and was surpassed by Saneyev (17.29 m) and the American James Butts (17.18 m), taking the bronze medal. In addition, he was fourth in the long jump. At the Pan American Games in Puerto Rico, he became twice champion in both the triple jump and the long jump, accumulating a four-time Pan American championship in two events. In the latter, he defeated none other than the future four-time Olympic champion of the event, Carl Lewis.

There exists some doubt on the judging of the 1980 Olympic men's triple jump final. Several jumps of winning distance by both Oliveira and Ian Campbell of Australia were adjudged as fouls by the all-Soviet judging panel, despite video replays showing this was not the case. One of Oliveira's jumps was estimated to be a new world record beyond eighteen metres. These decisions resulted in Soviet athletes Jaak Uudmäe and Viktor Saneyev winning the competition with performances in the low 17-metre area. Harry Seinberg, coach to Uudmäe, confirmed off-the-record that the judging had leaned in favour of the home athletes.

Only in 2000, twenty years after the Moscow Games, the Australian newspaper The Sydney Morning Herald, the largest in Australia, made a major report demonstrating that the Brazilian's canceled jumps were part of a Soviet operation to give Saneyev the fourth Olympic title. The plan didn't work out because of Uudmäe's best jump, but even so, the gold medal went to the USSR.

In contrast to the lack of luck in the Olympics, in the pre-World Championships in Athletics, João do Pulo was three-time world champion in the triple jump in 1977 (in Düsseldorf), 1979 (in Montreal) and 1981 (in Rome, with 17.37 m, beating Jaak Uudmäe, a year after the Olympics, and future world record holder Willie Banks of the United States). Flag bearer of Brazil in the opening parade in Montreal 1976 and in Moscow 1980, João was the main idol of the Brazilian sport between 1975 and 1981.

Death 

In 1981, he was in a car accident near São Paulo in which he lost one leg. Afterward, he became a vocal advocate for the rights of the disabled. He died in 1999 from complications of alcoholism.

His world record was only broken almost ten years later, by the North American Willie Banks, with 17.90 m, in Indianapolis, on June 16, 1985. His Brazilian and South American record was only broken more than twenty-one years ago. later, by Jadel Gregório, with 17.90 m, in Belém, on May 20, 2007 (who coincidentally was also an athlete of João do Pulo's former coach).

References 

1954 births
1999 deaths
People from Pindamonhangaba
Brazilian male triple jumpers
Brazilian male long jumpers
Olympic athletes of Brazil
Olympic bronze medalists for Brazil
Olympic bronze medalists in athletics (track and field)
Athletes (track and field) at the 1976 Summer Olympics
Athletes (track and field) at the 1980 Summer Olympics
Medalists at the 1980 Summer Olympics
Medalists at the 1976 Summer Olympics
Pan American Games athletes for Brazil
Pan American Games gold medalists for Brazil
Pan American Games medalists in athletics (track and field)
Athletes (track and field) at the 1975 Pan American Games
Athletes (track and field) at the 1979 Pan American Games
World record setters in athletics (track and field)
Deaths from cirrhosis
Alcohol-related deaths in Brazil
Medalists at the 1975 Pan American Games
Medalists at the 1979 Pan American Games
Sportspeople from São Paulo (state)
20th-century Brazilian people